David Edwin Wilson Arkless (born February 1954) is a British businessman, the former president of both CDI Corporation and ManpowerGroup.

Early life
Arkless studied at the University of Durham, where he read for a BA in General Studies. He subsequently attended INSEAD, IMD and the San José College of Business.

Career
Arkless is currently Professor at The University of Durham and CEO/Founder of his own consulting company, The ArkLight Consulting Group. Between 1992 and 2013, he was employed at ManpowerGroup, and was President of Global Corporate & Government Affairs. Prior to this, he worked for Hewlett-Packard and thereupon founded his own consulting company, Caden Corporation. Arkless also served as President-International for CDI Corporation. Arkless is a regular advisor to the US Department of State, and various EU departments, also he serves as both board member and corporate committee member of CIETT, the international confederation of private employment agencies. Since May 2010, Arkless has worked as vice president of the China International Council for the Promotion of Multinational Corporations (CICPMC) in Beijing.

As one of the founding members of the Global Agenda Council on the Skills Gap, Arkless is a regular participator in the World Economic Forum In 2011, he became president of the End Human Trafficking Now organisation. In 2018, Arkless became the Chairman of the Board of the anti-trafficking foundation, More Too Life. 

Arkless is a Knight of the Parte Guelfa in Florence, a Fellow of the Royal Society of Arts and has been elected as one of the top 50 CSR influencers in the world.

References 

1954 births
Living people
Alumni of Hatfield College, Durham
INSEAD alumni
British businesspeople